Terminal 1–Lindbergh station is a light rail station on the Metro Blue Line. It is a center-platform station that is accessed by escalator or elevator. Service began at the site when the second phase of the Blue Line opened on December 4, 2004.

Design 

The location of this station directly below a major airport caused challenges for its designers. The tunnel and the station both had to be carefully designed to meet Federal Aviation Administration safety requirements. Passengers can access this station from the transit center in the "Hub Building", which is reached by taking the Minneapolis–St. Paul Airport Trams, a people mover from the main terminal.

Due to concerns about terrorism, the tunnels were designed to be highly blast-resistant. The underground portion was the costliest section of the entire rail project.

This station was excavated after the two main tunnel tubes were constructed with a tunnel boring machine (though cut and cover was used near the ends of the tunnels). The station is the largest subterranean public space in Minnesota. During the excavation of the tunnels, a buried river valley was encountered a few hundred feet south of the station.

Lindbergh Station is unheated, but maintains a temperature of roughly 50–60 °F (10–15 °C) year-round because of its underground location.

Service between this station and Terminal 2–Humphrey station is free to passengers and operates 24-hours a day. The Blue Line is the main way for travelers to transfer between terminals. Along with Terminal 2-Humphrey station, the station is owned and maintained by the Metropolitan Airports Commission rather than Metro Transit.

Bus connections 
From the station, there is a direct bus connection to Route 54 to Downtown Saint Paul and the Mall of America.

Public art 
The station contains the artwork Dragonfly by Andrea Myklebust and Stanton Sears. The artwork is owned and maintained by the Minneapolis-Saint Paul International Airport. Myklebust and Sears have several other terrazzo floor artworks at the airport. The walls of the station are fabricated to look like an outcrop of Saint Peter Sandstone through which the tunnels have been bored.

References

External links 

Metro Transit: Terminal 1-Lindbergh Station

Metro Blue Line (Minnesota) stations in Hennepin County, Minnesota
Tunnels in Minnesota
Airport railway stations in the United States
Railway stations in the United States opened in 2004
2004 establishments in Minnesota
Tunnels completed in 2004
Railway stations located underground in the United States
Railway tunnels in the United States
Minneapolis–Saint Paul International Airport